Ibrahim Obyala Touré (27 September 1985 – 19 June 2014) was a professional footballer who played as a striker.

Personal life
He was the younger brother of former Manchester City midfielder Yaya Touré and former Arsenal and Manchester City defender Kolo Touré. He died at age 28 following a battle with cancer.

Career
Touré began his senior career with Ukrainian side Metalurh Donetsk in 2003, before joining French team Nice, originally on loan, following a successful trial.

Death
Touré died on 19 June 2014 in Manchester, England, after a short battle with cancer. The Ivory Coast FA confirmed in a statement that the 28-year-old died in Manchester.

References

1985 births
2014 deaths
Ivorian footballers
People from Bouaké
Ivorian expatriate footballers
Expatriate footballers in Syria
Al-Ittihad Aleppo players
Ivorian expatriate sportspeople in France
Expatriate footballers in France
Ivorian expatriate sportspeople in Egypt
Expatriate footballers in Egypt
Expatriate footballers in Libya
ASEC Mimosas players
OGC Nice players
FC Metalurh Donetsk players
Ligue 1 players
Expatriate footballers in Ukraine
Ivorian expatriate sportspeople in Ukraine
Toumodi FC players
Safa SC players
Deaths from cancer in England
Association football forwards
Syrian Premier League players
Lebanese Premier League players
Ivorian expatriate sportspeople in Lebanon
Expatriate footballers in Lebanon